Three ships in the United States Navy have been named USS Evans, the first two for Robley D. Evans, and the third for Ernest E. Evans.

  was a  launched in 1918, and transferred in 1940 to the Royal Navy as HMS Mansfield, and decommissioned in 1944
  was a  named for Ernest E. Evans. She was launched in 1955 and stricken in 1973

See also

United States Navy ship names